Enteromius citrinus is a species of ray-finned fish in the genus Enteromius which occurs only on the central Congo Basin in the Democratic Republic of Congo.

Footnotes 

 

Enteromius
Taxa named by George Albert Boulenger
Fish described in 1920
Endemic fauna of the Democratic Republic of the Congo